William Debonaire Haggard FSA, FRAS (2 Feb 1787 – 4 Apr 1866) was a numismatist and an expert on bullion. He was the Principal of the Bullion Office of the Bank of England in the 1840s.

Life 
Haggard was elected a Fellow of the Society of Antiquaries on 28 February 1833, described as "a gentleman peculiarly conversant in the numismatic antiquities of this country". He was also a Fellow of the Royal Asiatic Society, and the Royal Numismatic Society. He was President of the Royal Numismatic Society from 1847 to 1849.

His collection was sold at auction by Sotheby, Wilkinson & Hodge on 22–23 August 1866.

There is a portrait of Haggard, by Leonard Charles Wyon, 1844, in the British Museum.

He married Jane Le Crew, and they had at least one son, Mark Haggard.

Publications 
"Observations on the standard of value and the circulating medium of this country", The Numismatic Chronicle (1838-1842), 2, 17-35.
 Some remarks on the English coinage (1835)
 Miscellaneous papers (Windsor, 1860) - privately printed.
 "The life of Abraham Newland, late principal cashier of the Bank of England, 1808": Some comments on portions of the above essay, and remarks on our present monetary system (1866) 
 (with Eckfeldt, J., and Du Bois, W.) "New Varieties of Gold and Silver Coins, Counterfeit Coins, and Bullion, with Mint Values", The Numismatic Chronicle and Journal of the Numismatic Society, 13, 135-138 (1850). 
 "Californian Gold", The Numismatic Chronicle and Journal of the Numismatic Society, 13 (1850), 37-41. 
 "Notice of a medal of the Chevalier d'Eon", The Numismatic Chronicle and Journal of the Numismatic Society, 11 (1848), 48-56. 
 "Medals of the Pretender", The Numismatic Chronicle (1838-1842), 1 (1838), 219-222.
 "Medals of the Pretender (part 2)", The Numismatic Chronicle (1838-1842), 2, 37-42. 
 "Medals of the Pretender (part 3)", The Numismatic Chronicle (1838-1842), 3, 149-152. 
 "Experiments made on a Piece of Peña Silver, Saved from the Lady Charlotte, Wrecked on the Coast of Ireland in December 1838, as to Its Capability of Holding Water" (abstract).  Abstracts of the Papers Printed in the Philosophical Transactions of the Royal Society of London, 4 (1837), 118-119.

References

External links 
Haggard on worldcat.org

1780s births
1866 deaths
British numismatists
Fellows of the Society of Antiquaries of London
Presidents of the Royal Numismatic Society
People associated with the Bank of England
19th-century British businesspeople